Hugh Keenleyside Dam (formerly known as the High Arrow Dam) is a flood control dam spanning the Columbia River, 12 km (6.5  miles) upstream of the city of Castlegar, British Columbia, Canada.

Dam
The dam is operated by BC Hydro.

It was commissioned on October 10, 1968, six months ahead of schedule.

Immediately downstream of the dam a 185 megawatt (MW) hydroelectric powerhouse, the Arrow Lakes Generating Station, began construction in 1999 and was completed in 2002. The station is owned by the Columbia Power Corporation.

Lower Arrow Lake was raised 12 metres (40 feet) above the natural levels, resulting in several towns being dismantled and relocated before their sites were flooded, including Burton.

The dam was named after Hugh Llewellyn Keenleyside, the Canadian ambassador to Mexico, 1944–1947. Hugh Keenleyside served as the chairman of the British Columbia Power Commission and co-chairman at the British Columbia Hydro and Power Authority from 1962 to 1969.

The Arrow Lakes reservoir is described by BC Hydro as a "great waterway for boating", despite the effect that the  difference between high and low water has on docks and ramps. The dam is equipped with a navigation lock, which is available at no charge to boaters. However, commercial traffic and floating logs have priority over leisure craft.

See also

Hydroelectric dams on the Columbia River
List of dams in the Columbia River watershed
Mica Dam
Revelstoke Dam
List of generating stations in BC

References

Dams in British Columbia
West Kootenay
Castlegar, British Columbia
Dams on the Columbia River
Dams completed in 1968
Embankment dams
BC Hydro
1968 establishments in British Columbia
Publicly owned dams in Canada